Hainesville is an unincorporated community in Hampshire County, West Virginia, United States. Hainesville is located southwest of Slanesville at the crossroads of Old Martinsburg Road (County Route 45/9) and Kedron Road (County Route 45/11). Additionally, formerly known as Haines Store, Hainesville once had its own post office in operation.

References 

Unincorporated communities in Hampshire County, West Virginia
Unincorporated communities in West Virginia